The 2022 FFAS Senior League was the 41st season of the FFAS Senior League, top American Samoan league for association football clubs since its establishment in 1976. Vaiala Tongan were the defending champions, having won their first FFAS Senior League, although Ilaoa and To'omata won the 2022 FFAS Senior League undefeated.

Teams
Eleven teams competed in the league following the return Taputimu Youth since 2019.

 Black Roses
 Green Bay
 Ilaoa and To'omata
 Lion Heart
 Pago Youth
 PanSa
 Royal Puma
 Tafuna Jets
 Taputimu Youth
 Utulei Youth
 Vaiala Tongan

League table

Results

a Awarded

Season statistics

Top scorers

References

FFAS Senior League seasons
2022 in Oceanian association football leagues
2022 in American Samoan football